Antoinette "Toni" Harris (born July 29, 1996)  is an American college football player who was a safety for Central Methodist University in the National Association of Intercollegiate Athletics (NAIA). She is the first woman to receive a full college football scholarship as a non-specialist, and the second woman to ever play football on scholarship.

Born in Detroit, she played football for her high school, Redford Union High School, in Redford, Michigan.

Two years later, Harris moved to California to play free safety at East Los Angeles College, where she played for two years under the direction of Head Coach Bobby Godinez. She became the first woman to ever play for East Los Angeles College, and earned six offers to play football at four-year universities.

In 2019, she was the focus and star of a Super Bowl commercial for the Toyota RAV4. Since attending Central Methodist University with eligibility left to play due to the pandemic, Harris graduated with honors with a Bachelor of Science in Criminal Justice and will now be attending the University of Southern California to pursue a Master’s of Science in Criminal Justice. Harris hasn’t decided how she will use eligibility, but plans to still continue playing football and breaking barriers for women.

See also
 List of female American football players

References

External links 

 Toni Harris, featured in Super Bowl ad, aspires to be 1st female NFL player (CBS Mornings on YouTube)

1996 births
Living people
African-American sportswomen
African-American players of American football
Players of American football from Detroit
Female players of American football
Bethany College (Kansas) alumni
East Los Angeles College alumni
Players of American football from Los Angeles
21st-century African-American sportspeople
21st-century African-American women
People from Redford, Michigan